The 2014 Kenyan National Super League was the inaugural season of the Kenyan National Super League since being established on 10 July 2013, and the 51st second division season since its establishment in 1963. Competition was scheduled to begin on 8 March, but was postponed and instead began a week later on 15 March.

A total of 24 teams, divided into 2 zones of 12 teams each, competed for the league, with 22 promoted from FKF Division One, which has since become the third tier of the Kenyan football league system after the introduction of the National Super League, and 2 teams relegated from the Kenyan Premier League. The top two teams from each zone, Kakamega Homeboyz, Nakumatt, Posta Rangers and Shabana, all gained promotion to the Premier League for the 2015 season, which is set to be contested by 18 teams, up from 16 for the 2014 season.

Changes from last season

From Division One
Promoted to Premier League
 Kenya Revenue Authority
 Top Fry AllStars

Remaining in Division One

 Admiral
 Alaskan
 Brighter Stars
 Coast United
 Comply
 FC West Ham United
 Field Negroes
 Green Berets
 Gusii Raiders
 Jericho AllStars
 Kambakia Christian Centre
 Kibera Celtic

 Kisero
 Kisumu Municipal
 Kolongolo
 Longonot Horticulture
 Mount Kenya United
 Mumbi Nationale
 Mumcop
 Sparki Youth
 Suam Orchards
 Timsales
 Utawala
 Vihiga Stars

To National Super League
Relegated from Premier League
 Kakamega Homeboyz
 Karuturi Sports

Promoted from FKF Division One

 Administration Police
 Agrochemical
 Bidco United
 Busia United Stars
 FC Talanta
 Finlays Horticulture
 G.F.C. 105
 Hotsprings FC
 Kariobangi Sharks
 Ligi Ndogo
 Mahakama

 Modern Coast Rangers
 MOYAS
 Nairobi Stima
 Nakumatt
 Nzoia United
 Oserian
 Posta Rangers
 Shabana
 St. Joseph
 West Kenya Sugar
 Zoo Kericho

Team name changes
Hotsprings to Rift Valley United
Karuturi Sports to Vegpro

Teams

League tables and results

Zone A

League table (Zone A)

Positions by round (Zone A)
The table lists the positions of teams after each week of matches. In order to preserve chronological evolvements, any postponed matches are not included to the round at which they were originally scheduled, but added to the full round they were played immediately afterwards. For example, if a match is scheduled for matchday 13, but then postponed and played between days 16 and 17, it will be added to the standings for day 16.

Results (Zone A)

Zone B

League table (Zone B)

Positions by round (Zone B)
The table lists the positions of teams after each week of matches. In order to preserve chronological evolvements, any postponed matches are not included to the round at which they were originally scheduled, but added to the full round they were played immediately afterwards. For example, if a match is scheduled for matchday 13, but then postponed and played between days 16 and 17, it will be added to the standings for day 16.

Results (Zone B)

Top scorers

Zone A top scorers

Last updated: 2 November 2014

Zone B top scorers

Last updated: 6 September 2014

References

Kenya
Kenya
Kenya
Kenya
Kenyan National Super League
2
2014